Yolanda Soares is a Portuguese soprano singer, songwriter and "crossover" solo artist. Soares' performances are operatic productions which blend pop arrangements and classical vocals, most notably fado.

Early life and career
Soares was born in Lisbon, the daughter of Fernando and Mila Soares. She credits her parents for her background in traditional fado and dance. Soares entered the "Conservatorio Nacional de Lisboa" (Lisbon's National Conservatory) to study ballet, but soon changed to singing.

In 2007 Soares released her first album, entitled Music Box – Fado em Concerto. For the CD, she was nominated as Musical Newcomer of the Year (Revelação do Ano) at the 2007 Portuguese Golden Globe awards. Soares released her second album, Metamorphosis, in 2010.

Discography 
2007 – Music Box- Fado em Concerto 
2010 – Metamorphosis

References

External links

Living people
Crossover (music)
Singers from Lisbon
Portuguese fado singers
Portuguese sopranos
Portuguese women songwriters
Year of birth missing (living people)